Dorsum Heim is a wrinkle ridge at  in Mare Imbrium on the Moon. It is 148 km long and was named after Swiss geologist Albert Heim in 1976.

References

Ridges on the Moon
Mare Imbrium